Vishvesh Parmar is an Indian playback singer/ recording artist and composer, known for his composition Pankhida for the urban Gujarati Film, Kevi Rite Jaish. He was the recipient of the Binani Big Gujarati award for Most Entertaining Song in 2012.

Early life 
Vishvesh Parmar was born in Anand (the Milk City of India) on 28 November 1983 and grew up in Nadiad, both towns are in the Gujarat state. He attended school at St. Mary's High School, Nadiad and in August 2001, moved within the state to Vallabh Vidyanagar to pursue his engineering degree at A.D Patel Institute of Technology.

Career 
In February 2007, he moved to Ahmadabad, Gujarat where he began giving solo performances on weekends at local cafes. In July 2008 Vishvesh moved to Mumbai to study sound engineering and recording arts, and went on to work as a sound engineer in the Bollywood film industry. In 2012 he made his debut as a composer for the film 'Kevi Rite Jaish' with the song 'Pankhida' and 'Kharekhar'.

Pankhida reception 
Pankhida was Vishvesh Parmar's first composition, and became very popular within just a few hours of its release. After the song was made available for download (26 May 2012), it had over 100,000 downloads in the first four days, from the official website alone. It was declared a 'viral hit' by leading newspapers

Filmography

Awards 
2012: Won the Binani Big Gujarati Award for The Most Entertaining Song 2012 for the song "Pankhida" from the movie Kevi Rite Jaish.

References 

Indian male playback singers
People from Anand district
Living people
1983 births
People from Nadiad